Albert "Duke" Lattimore (March 26, 1904 – February 22, 1986), also listed as Alphonso Lattimore, was an American baseball catcher in the Negro leagues. He played with Baltimore Black Sox in 1929 and the Columbus Blue Birds in 1933.

References

External links
 and Seamheads

Baltimore Black Sox players
Columbus Blue Birds players
1904 births
1986 deaths
Baseball players from Georgia (U.S. state)
Baseball catchers
20th-century African-American sportspeople